Percy Dwight Wickman (June 10, 1941 – July 3, 2004) was a Canadian politician and well-known activist for people with disabilities.  He was born in Thunder Bay, Ontario.

Wickman served as an alderman on Edmonton City Council from 1977 to 1986. He made headlines when he was elected as Liberal MLA for Edmonton-Whitemud after unseating Alberta premier Don Getty in the 1989 election, despite the fact Getty had otherwise won a majority government. In 1993 election and 1997 election Wickman was re-elected as the MLA for Edmonton Rutherford. Wickman retired from politics in 2001. He wasn't just a politician he helped many people with disabilities. He himself was in a wheelchair.

Wickman died in 2004 due to a paraplegic-related infection at the age of 63. He will be greatly missed by his family and others.

References

Further reading

External links
Death of Percy Wickman
Embarrassment for Getty CBC Archives

1941 births
2004 deaths
Alberta Liberal Party MLAs
Canadian politicians with disabilities
Northern Alberta Institute of Technology alumni
Politicians from Thunder Bay
Politicians with paraplegia